Dr. Amit Mitra is an Indian economist and politician  and the current Special Advisor to Chief Minister of West Bengal on Finance. Previously he was the Finance, Commerce & Industries Minister of the government of Indian state of West Bengal. He was the incumbent MLA in the West Bengal state assembly from the Khardaha state assembly constituency. Cited as a giant killer in the 2011 West Bengal state assembly election defeating Asim Dasgupta, the former West Bengal  Finance Minister. Mitra previously served as the Secretary general of the Federation of Indian Chambers of Commerce and Industry (FICCI).

Family
Son of Haridas Mitra, a freedom fighter and former Deputy Speaker of the West Bengal Legislative Assembly and Bela Mitra. His maternal grandfather was Suresh Chandra Bose, elder brother of Netaji Subhas Chandra Bose. Both Suresh Chandra Bose and Haridas Mitra were part of the secret service team of Azad Hind Fauj. Bela Mitra took charge of the secret service of Azad Hind Fauj from Haridas Mitra. Belanagar railway station in Howrah district on the Howrah-Bardhaman chord line, is named after her.

Education
Mitra went to Calcutta Boys' School  and graduated from Presidency College when it was an affiliate of the University of Calcutta with a degree in Economics. He was a notable debater in West Bengal inter-college debate competitions. Mitra received a Masters from the Delhi School of Economics, University of Delhi and, in 1978, a PhD from Duke University in the USA. Dr. Mitra is included in Duke University's list of distinguished alumni.

Early career
He taught at Duke University and Franklin & Marshall College for over a decade before returning to India. He received the prestigious Sears-Roebuck Foundation Award for Distinguished Teaching, 1990.

He joined the Federation of Indian Chambers of Commerce and Industry and rose to be its secretary-general. He resigned as secretary-general of FICCI on May 18, 2011 upon his election as state assembly representative.
 During his tenure, he transformed FICCI into a professional organisation to research and formulate India's policy during its economic liberalisation. The number of conferences organised by FICCI rose from 10 to 500 between 1994 and 2011 and its revenues saw an increase from Rs 3 crore to Rs 110 crore during the period Dr. Mitra presided over its activities.

He served as an Additional Director of Steel Authority of India Ltd from March 25, 2003 to March 24, 2006. At the request of Mamata Banerjee, the railway minister, he headed a panel to draw up business plans for the public-private partnership projects of the railways. He has been on the government's advisory committee on the World Trade Organization and the National Manufacturing Competitiveness Council.  He was associated with Planning Commission as a member of the expert group on equitable development.  He has also been appointed a member on the Board of Air India-National Aviation Company of India Ltd. (NACIL). He is also on the Board of IL&FS –CDI, a hundred per cent subsidiary of Infrastructure Leasing & Financial Services Limited (IL&FS) which is one of India's leading infrastructure development and finance company, Also on the Board of Delhi Mumbai Industrial Corridor Development Corporation (DMICDC).

Dr Mitra was also a Member on the Advisory Board of the India Fund of the Unit Trust of India (UTI), Member, Advisory Board of Microsoft Corporation (India) Pvt. Ltd., a marketing subsidiary of Microsoft in India, Member, Central Listing Authority, established by the Securities and Exchange Board of India (SEBI), Member, Life Insurance Council, Member of the ‘Eminent Persons Group’ established by the UNCTAD Secretary General on Non-Tariff Barriers (NTBs)- 2006, Member, Consultative Group set up by the Inter-State Council Secretariat (ISCS), Member, Committee on Public-Private Partnership in the area of Defence (2004–2005), Member, Advisory Committee on Competition Advocacy for advising Competition Commission of India, Member, Expert Committee to formulate energy Policy by Planning Commission (2005–06), Member of the "India-China Eminent Persons Group" from the Indian side, and Member, Advisory Committee to Union Commerce Minister of India on International Trade (WTO), and Member of the "Indo – EU Roundtable" from the Indian side (initiated by Government of India and the EU). He is a Member of the Joint Study Groups set up between the Governments of India-China, India-Japan, India-Israel, India-Korea & Indo-Russia. He is also represented on various sectoral Committees/Sub-Groups constituted by the National Manufacturing Competitive Council and the Planning Commission, Member of the ‘Expert Group on Equitable Development’ set up by the Planning Commission for preparing the Eleventh Five Year Plan. He was also Trustee of India Brand Equity Foundation. He was appointed in the two-member committee by the Department of Revenue, Ministry of Finance, Government of India for suggesting Alternative Scheme of Collecting Excise Duties.

Political career
Amit Mitra joined All India Trinamool Congress on the invitation of Mamata Banerjee and contested during the state assembly election of 2011 from the Khardaha state assembly constituency. He was attributed a giant killer after the election as he defeated state Finance Minister Asim Dasgupta by a margin of 26,154 votes. Asim Dasgupta was elected from the Khardaha constituency previously  five times in a row during the state assembly elections of 1987, 1991, 1996, 2001 and 2006.

Amit Mitra was sworn in as a minister on May 20, 2011 and was given the Finance and Excise portfolio.

Amit Mitra has opined that the ‘minimal capital expenditure’ made over a long period by the state government has led to the state of bankruptcy. He feels that the state's financial condition can be improved with a flow of investments and expansion of the state's existing industrial units.

Awards
Amit Mitra is a Padma Shree Award Winner from Government of India in the year 2008 . The Japanese government conferred the `Order of the Rising Sun' on Amit Mitra in 2005 by His Majesty the Emperor of Japan. The award was presented for his contribution towards promotion of friendly relations between India and Japan. He is also the recipient of highest civilian Awards conferred by President of the Republic of Italy in 2007.

References

External links
Dr. Amit Mitra - WB Assembly Profile
 Profile 

Living people
Bengali Hindus
Indian economists
Presidency University, Kolkata alumni
University of Calcutta alumni
Delhi School of Economics alumni
Delhi University alumni
Duke University alumni
West Bengal MLAs 2011–2016
West Bengal MLAs 2016–2021
Politicians from Kolkata
Trinamool Congress politicians from West Bengal
State cabinet ministers of West Bengal
Recipients of the Padma Shri in trade and industry
20th-century Indian economists
1947 births